The 2016 end-of-year rugby union internationals, also known as the 2016 Autumn Internationals in the Northern Hemisphere, were a series of international rugby union matches predominantly played between the visiting Southern Hemisphere countries: Argentina, Australia, New Zealand and South Africa – and the European sides: England, France, Ireland, Italy, Scotland and Wales.

The 2016 November international window saw 37 international matches take place, with an additional seven international matches taking place outside the allocated three week window. 27 nations across all three tiers competed in at least one test, with a record 27 matches including a tier 2 or tier 3 side, seven of which were a tier 1 v tier 2 fixture, as World Rugby tried to build on the tier 2 success in the 2015 Rugby World Cup, moving towards the 2019 Rugby World Cup. Coinciding with the international window, the 2016 Cup of Nations took place, bringing the total number of matches up to 51 for 31 nations. Australia attempted their first Grand Slam tour of the Home Nations since 2013. It was their tenth attempt at a Grand Slam, which they have achieved on only one occasion, in 1984. Australia were unsuccessful in their grand slam attempt, losing to both Ireland and England. In addition to their Grand Slam tour, Australia also played France, before playing the French Barbarians for the first time since 2005. World Champions New Zealand played Ireland twice, one of which was played at the historic Soldier Field stadium in Chicago, the venue having previously hosted tests between the Eagles, All Blacks and Wallabies in 2014 and 2015. The game gave Ireland their first victory over New Zealand at the 29th attempt, in a rivalry dating  back to 1905. The other Ireland v New Zealand test took place in Ireland as part of the All Blacks' European tour, which also saw them play Italy and France. England and Wales both played host to Argentina and South Africa, while the Pumas and Springboks also travelled to Scotland and Italy respectively. As in recent seasons, New Zealand and Australia played the third and final Bledisloe Cup Test match for the year, with New Zealand having already secured the cup 2–0 during the 2016 Rugby Championship.

Tier 2 teams
Unlike previous November tests, World Rugby has given more tier 2 nations a tier 1 fixture, seeing not only the touring Pacific Island nations; Fiji, Samoa and Tonga compete against a top side, but also Canada, Georgia and Japan. Fiji will play England, France will host Samoa, while Italy will host Tonga. Ireland will play host to Canada in what will be Canada's first visit to Ireland, and a tier 1 nation (excluding World Cup years), since November 2008. Georgia will visit Scotland for the first ever time, playing just their second ever test against each other, the first outside a Rugby World Cup. It will be the first time since November 2014 that Georgia has played a tier 1 test, excluding their 2015 World Cup games against Argentina and New Zealand. Japan will play host to Argentina for the first time since 1998, in what will be the first test between the two nations since 2005, before Japan travels to Wales for the first time since 2007. It will be their first encounter against each other since June 2013, when Japan earned their first ever victory over the Welsh.

Following a reduced 2016 World Rugby Pacific Nations Cup to include just the Pacific nations, World Rugby organized intercontinental matches between the Pacific Islanders, North America and Japan at neutral venues in Europe; Fiji will play Japan and Samoa will play Canada in France, while Tonga will play the United States in Spain. In addition to these tests, Japan and Samoa will be hosted by Georgia, while both Canada and the United States will travel to Romania. Uruguay will play their first ever 3-test European tour having secured tier 2 status. They will visit Spain for the first time since 2011 and Romania in a first ever one-off test outside any tournament. They will also play Germany in what will be the first ever meeting between the two sides. It will also be a first meeting for Spain and Tonga when they play each other in Madrid. In Belgium's only test, they will travel to Portugal in what be the team's first one-off test outside any tournament.

Tier 3 and invitational teams
As part of World Rugby's strategy to provide increasing support to cross-regional international competition, Brazil embarked on their first ever European tour, playing a two-test series against Germany, in what was Germany's first ever home test against Brazil, and their first non-European opponent at home since Hong Kong in 2010. It was the first time since the 2011 Cup of Nations that Brazil has left the Americas region for a test match. Furthermore, Portugal played host to the Brazilians for the first ever time, having already played in Brazil in November 2013. In addition to Brazil's historic tour, Chile played host to their first ever Asian team when South Korea plays a two-test series against Los Condores. It was the first time that South Korea has left the Asian region for a test match since playing Tonga in 2007, and their first non-qualifying test match since playing Australia in 1987.

Several invitational teams were in action during the window, where the Barbarians played three national sides; South Africa, competing for the Killik Cup, Fiji and Czech Republic. The Czech Republic were the first team outside the elite 20 nations since Belgium in May 2008. It will serve as a celebration match for the 90th anniversary of the Czech Rugby Union. The Māori All Blacks toured for the first time since 2014, playing the United States in Chicago, in a match that was part of 'The Rugby Weekend', doubling up with the Ireland–New Zealand game the same weekend. The Māori All Blacks later travelled to Europe, playing Irish side Munster in Limerick and English side Harlequins in London.

Fixtures

Notes:
 Samuela Anise, Uwe Helu, Kyosuke Kajikawa, Malgene Ilaua, Heiichiro Ito, Timothy Lafaele, Lomano Lemeki, Amanaki Lotoahea, Shuhei Matsuhashi, Yuhimaru Mimura, Satoshi Nakatani, Takahiro Ogawa and Koki Yamamoto (all Japan) made their international debuts.
 This was Argentina's largest winning margin over Japan, surpassing the 32 point margin set in 2005, while scoring their most points against Japan.
 This was Argentina's first ever win in Japan.

Notes:
 Sam Davies and Cory Hill (both Wales) and Tolu Latu (Australia) made their international debuts.
 This was Wales's largest home defeat since 2006, when New Zealand beat them 46–10.
 Australia retain the James Bevan Trophy.

Notes:
 This was the Barbarians first draw with an international team since they drew with Scotland 16−16 in 1991.
 The draw saw the teams share the Killik Cup.

Notes:
 Joey Carbery (Ireland) and Scott Barrett (New Zealand) made their international debuts.
 Julian Savea (New Zealand) earned his 50th test cap.
 This was Ireland's first ever victory over New Zealand in 28 attempts since 1905.
 This was the most points (40) and tries (5) New Zealand have conceded in a single test since Steve Hansen became coach and the All Blacks became world champions following the 2011 World Cup, surpassing the 38 points England scored against them in December 2012 and the 4 tries South Africa scored in the final match of the 2013 Rugby Championship.

Notes:
 This was the first time since beating South Africa 6–0 in 1961, that the Barbarians has not conceded any points against an international opposition.

Notes:
 This was Munster's first ever match against the Māori All Blacks.

Notes:
 Anzor Sitchinava (Georgia) and Shunsuke Nunomaki and Yasuo Yamaji (both Japan) made their international debuts.

Notes:
 Giorgio Bronzini (Italy) and Liam Coltman and Rieko Ioane (both New Zealand) made their international debuts.

Notes:
 Nathan Hughes, Kyle Sinckler and Ben Te'o (all England) and Francois Venter (South Africa) made their international debut.
 Courtney Lawes (England) earned his 50th test cap.
 This was England 's first win over South Africa since their 23–21 win during the 2006 Autumn Internationals.

Notes:
 Allan Dell (Scotland) made his international debut.
 Ross Ford (Scotland) became the third Scotsman to earn his 100th test cap.
 Israel Folau and Nick Phipps (both Australia) earned their 50th test caps.
 Australia retain the Hopetoun Cup.

 Mathew Foulds, Carlos Gavidi, Alvar Gimeno and Fabien Perrin (all Spain) and Kotoni Ale, Tevita Koloamatangi, Valentino Mapapalangi, Fetuli Paea and Tevita Taufu’i (all Tonga) made their international debuts.
 This was the first ever match played between these two nations.
 This was Tonga's 100th test victory.

Notes:
 Tangimana Fonovai and Florin Popa (both Romania) and Bryce Campbell, Nick Civetta, Madison Hughes, Martin Iosefo and Matai Leuta (all United States) made their international debuts.
 Romania claimed the Pershing Cup.

Notes:
 Cyril Baille (France) and Elia Elia, Genesis Mamea and Chris Vui (all Samoa) made their international debuts.

Notes:
 Dasch Barber, Marcel Coetzee, Marvin Dieckmann and Sebastian Ferreira (all Germany) and Juan Manuel Cat and Santiago Hernández (both Uruguay) made their international debuts.
 This was the first ever meeting between the two nations.
 This was the first time since 27 October 2012, that Germany has beaten a side ranked higher than them in the World Rugby Rankings; Germany (31) Ukraine (29).

Notes:
 Dan Biggar (Wales) earned his 50th test cap.

Notes:
 Niyi Adeolokun, Billy Holland, Dan Leavy, Jack O'Donoghue, Luke McGrath, Garry Ringrose, John Ryan and James Tracy (all Ireland) and Admir Cejvanovic (Canada) made their international debuts.

Notes:
 Giorgi Koshadze (Georgia) and Hisa Sasagi (Samoa) made their international debuts.
 Giorgi Begadze (Georgia) earned his 50th test cap.
 This was Georgia's largest winning margin over Samoa, surpassing the 1 point difference set in 2013.

Notes:
 Simone Ferrari and Nicola Quaglio both made their international debuts Italy.
 This was Italy's first ever win over South Africa in 13 attempts, and was Italy's first ever win over one of the big three Southern Hemisphere nations (Australia, New Zealand and South Africa).

Notes:
 Charlie Ewels (England) made his international debut.
 Sunia Koto (Fiji) earned his 50th test cap.

Notes:
 Takeshi Hino (Japan) made his international debut.

Notes:
 Arturo Iniguez and Juan Ramos (both Spain) made their international debuts.

Notes:
 Cristi Chirica (Romania) made his international debut.

Notes:
 Marcel Brache (United States) made his international debut.

Notes:
 Magnus Bradbury (Scotland) made his international debut.
 Nicolás Sánchez (Argentina) earned his 50th test cap.
 This is the first time that Scotland has won three matches in a row against Argentina.

Notes:
 Yoann Maestri (France) earned his 50th test cap.
 Kyle Godwin (Australia) made his international debut.
 This was Australia's first win over France in France since their 59–16 win in 2010
 Australia reclaimed the Trophée des Bicentenaires for the first time since 2014.

Notes:
 Nephi Leatigaga and Ope Peleseuma (both Samoa) made their international debut.

Notes:
 This was Tonga's first win over Italy since winning 28–25 during the 1999 Rugby World Cup.
 This was Tonga's fifth ever win over a tier 1 nation, their first since beating Scotland 21–15 in 2012.
 Cooper Vuna made his Tongan international debut, having previously earned 2 international caps for Australia.

Notes:
 Joeli Veitayaki Jr. (Fiji) made his international debut.

Notes:
 Ali Price (Scotland) made his international debut.

Notes:
 Ionuț Mureșan and Alexandru Tigla (both Romania) and Marcos Chamyan (Uruguay) made their international debuts.

Notes: 
 Rory Best became the fifth Irishman to earn his 100th test cap.
 This was the first time Ireland had achieved back to back wins over Australia since their 1979 Tour of Australia.
 Ireland becomes just the second Northern Hemisphere nation, besides England in both 2002 and 2003, to earn wins over Australia, New Zealand and South Africa all in the same year.
 This was the first time that Ireland has retained the Lansdowne Cup.

Notes:
 This was Wales' largest winning margin over South Africa, surpassing the 10 point margin set in 1999.
 Uzair Cassiem, Jean-Luc du Preez and Rohan Janse van Rensburg (all South Africa) made their international debuts.
 This was the first ever time that Wales had retained the Prince William Cup.

Notes:
 This was New Zealand's 10th consecutive victory over France, their longest ever winning streak over the French.
 New Zealand retained the Dave Gallaher Trophy for the fourth consecutive time.

Notes:
 England retained the Cook Cup.
 England became only the 2nd team in the professional era to win all their matches in a calendar year, after New Zealand in 2013. Note New Zealand (1997) and Ireland (2009) both went the year unbeaten, but drew tests with England and Australia respectively.

See also
 2016 World Rugby Americas Pacific Challenge
 2016 Cup of Nations
 2019 Rugby World Cup
 2016 mid-year rugby union internationals
 End of year rugby union tests
 Mid-year rugby union tests

References

2016
2016–17 in European rugby union
2016–17 in Scottish rugby union
2016 in Oceanian rugby union
2016 in North American rugby union
2016 in South American rugby union
2016 in South African rugby union
2016 in Asian rugby union